Woodbine is a small unincorporated community in Cooke County, Texas, a few miles south of U.S. Route 82 east of Gainesville, Texas. The population was 246 at the 2000 census. It is part of the Gainesville TX-Micropolitan Statistical Area and the Texoma Region.

The Woodbine Formation is a Cretaceous geologic formation named for the small community in 1905.

History
Settlement of the area known as Mineola began back in the 1840s, but the first residents did not become permanent until the mid-1860s. In 1879, the Denison and Pacific Railroad came through, and the community was renamed Woodbine for the abundant vines in the area. Its railroad depot was the first in Cooke County, and the community prospered from it. The same year, Woodbine received a post office that would exist until the Great Depression of the 1930s. By 1900, Woodbine's population was 100, though this figure declined by half by 1940. In 1950, Woodbine had 20 residents. Only its proximity to Gainesville prevented it from disappearing altogether, with a resurgence of population wanting to live outside the city.

External links
Woodbine, Texas at Texas Escapes

Notes and references

Unincorporated communities in Cooke County, Texas
Unincorporated communities in Texas